Miodrag "Mile" Petrović (1915 – 1990) was a Croatian rower. He competed in the men's eight event at the 1948 Summer Olympics.

References

External links
 

1915 births
1990 deaths
Croatian male rowers
Olympic rowers of Yugoslavia
Rowers at the 1948 Summer Olympics